Mohabbat Ki Kasauti also called Rooplekha in Bengali was a 1934 Indian "semi-historical" bilingual film in Hindi and Bengali, directed by P. C. Barua for New Theatres. Though Barua is consistently mentioned as director, according to author J. K. Bajaj, Debaki Bose directed Rooplekha in 1934. It had music by R. C. Boral and the cast included Rattanbai, K. L. Saigal, Pahari Sanyal, Noor Mohammed Charlie and Vishwanath. Jamuna started her career with a small role in the Hindi version.

The film had Saigal playing the role of Akbar according to Pran Nevile, but it has also been cited as a film based on a Buddhist fable. The film was one of the first Indian Talkies to use the concept of flashback technique in the narrative.

Cast
K. L. Saigal
Rattan Bai
Pahari Sanyal
Noor Mohammed Charlie
Jamuna
Vishwanath

Soundtrack
The music direction was by R. C. Boral and the lyricist was Bani Kumar. There were 13 songs in the film with "Sab Din Hott Na Ek Samaan" sung by Saigal with lyrics by Surdas.

Track listing

References

External links
 

1934 films
1930s Hindi-language films
Bengali-language Indian films
Indian black-and-white films
1934 drama films
Indian drama films
Films directed by Pramathesh Barua
Hindi-language drama films